The following is a list of notable events and releases of the year 1993 in Norwegian music.

Events

April
 10 – The 20th Vossajazz started in Voss, Norway (April 10 – 12).

June
 2 – The 21st Nattjazz started in Bergen, Norway (June 2 – 13).
 26 – The 24th Kalvøyafestivalen started at Kalvøya near by Oslo (June 26 – 27).

July
 13 – The 33rd Moldejazz started in Molde, Norway (July 13 – 18).

Albums released

Unknown date

A
 Jan Garbarek
 If You Look Far Enough (ECM Records) with Ralph Towner and Nana Vasconcelos

Deaths

 August
 10 – Øystein Aarseth, black metal guitarist and music producer (born 1968).

 November
 18 – Arvid Fladmoe, composer and orchestra conductor (born 1915).

 December
 27 – Cissi Cleve, composer (born 1911).

Births

 May
 4 – Chris Holsten, singer and songwriter.

 July
 20 – Debrah Scarlett, singer and songwriter.

 September
 6 – Eline Thorp, songwriter and artist.

 November
 21 – Fredrik Halland, singer, songwriter, guitarist, and music producer.

 Unknown date
 Arne Martin Nybo, jazz guitarist.
 Rohey Taalah, soul and jazz singer.

See also
 1993 in Norway
 Music of Norway
 Norway in the Eurovision Song Contest 1993

References

 
Norwegian music
Norwegian
Music
1990s in Norwegian music